Claus Schromm (born 21 April 1969) is a German football coach who last managed SpVgg Unterhaching.

On 26 March 2015 he was appointed as the head coach of SpVgg Unterhaching for the second time. He left after five years on 29 July 2020.

References

External links

1969 births
Living people
German football managers
SpVgg Unterhaching managers
Sportspeople from Munich
3. Liga managers